Khwaja Muhammad Usman Damani was a prominent Muslim scholar and Sufi shaykh of Naqshbandi tariqah of the 19th century (1828–1897) in South Asia (present day Pakistan).

Early life
He was born to Mawlana Moosa Jan in 1244 AH at Loni town in the Dera Ismail Khan district, present day Pakistan. His father belonged to the Damani tribe and his mother belonged to the family of Khwaja Bandanawaz Sayyid Muhammad Gesudaraz Gulberga (Ibdia). He was a khalifa and successor of Khwaja Dost Muhammad Qandhari, and was the successor of khanqah Mussa Zai Sharif in Dera Ismail Khan.

Work 
His shaykh awarded him with Ijazah (Khilafat) of eight Sufi orders, namely Naqshbandi Mujaddidi, Qadri, Chishti, Suhrawardi, Shattari, Madaria, Kibrawiya and Qalandari.

His letters are published in a collection named Tuhfa Zahidia with an Urdu translation. In the last years of his life, he did not take the oath of allegiance from newcomers and referred them to one of his two leading Khulafa, namely Khwaja Sirajuddin Naqshbandi his son and Sayyad Laal Shah Hamdani.

He died on Tuesday 22 Shaban 1314 AH (26 January 1897) and was buried in Mussa Zai Sharif alongside the grave of his Shaykh Khwaja Dost Muhammad Qandhari. His Janazah prayer was led by his son Khwaja Sirajuddin Naqshbandi.

Chain of succession

Khwaja Muhammad Usman Damani belonged to the Mujaddidi order of Sufism, which is the main branch of Naqshbandi Sufi tariqah. His spiritual lineage goes to Muhammad, through Shaikh Ahmad Sirhindi, the Mujaddid of eleventh Hijri century.

Khulafa
 Khwaja Sirajuddin Naqshbandi, his son and successor (d.1915)
 Sayyad Laal Shah Hamdani (d.1896)
 Mawlana Shirazi
 Abdur-Rahman Bahadur Kilmi (d.1922)

References

External links
https://web.archive.org/web/20040421095419/http://bagharshareef.com/
 Jalwa Gah-e-Dost (Urdu) 2nd edition (2008) by Khwaja Muhammad Tahir Bakhshi
 Short Biography in Urdu by Mukhtar Ahmed Khokhar

19th-century Muslim scholars of Islam
Naqshbandi order
People from British India
Pashtun Sufi saints
Pashtun Sufis
1820s births
1897 deaths
Pashtun people